Hannah Conda is the stage name of Chris Collins, a drag performer most known for competing on the second season of RuPaul's Drag Race Down Under where she placed runner up.

Personal life 
Collins relocated from Perth to Sydney.

References

External links
 Hannah Conda at IMDb

Australian drag queens
RuPaul's Drag Race Down Under contestants
Living people

Year of birth missing (living people)